Showcase is a Canadian English-language discretionary specialty channel owned by Corus Entertainment. Launched on January 1, 1995, the channel primarily airs scripted and dramatic television series.

History
Licensed in 1994, Showcase was a venture between Alliance Communications (prior to its merger with Atlantis), the Canadian Broadcasting Corporation and a number of smaller independent Canadian producers, and was intended to be a showcase for "the best of independently-produced movies, drama, comedy and mini-series from Canada and around the world", with limited content from the United States. It launched at midnight on January 1, 1995, with a short introductory montage and its first program, Monty Python's Life of Brian, shown as part of its program The Showcase Revue.

Showcase later spawned two digital television services, the male-oriented Action (formerly Showcase Action, which was replaced by the Canadian version of Adult Swim in April 2019) and the more female-oriented Showcase Diva (which rebranded to a Canadian version of Lifetime in 2012). On December 19, 2006, Alliance Atlantis launched a high definition simulcast of Showcase, available through all major television providers in Canada.

After several acquisitions over the years, Alliance Atlantis gained full control of Showcase. On January 18, 2008, a joint venture between Canwest and Goldman Sachs Capital Partners known as CW Media bought Alliance Atlantis and gained AAC's interest in Showcase. Following its acquisition by Canwest, the channel's new management felt that Showcase's adult programming was alienating viewers and advertisers. On August 31, 2009, Showcase underwent a major rebranding, introducing a new programming lineup with a greater focus on hit dramas and films. At the same time, Showcase Diva was given a new look and Showcase Action was rebranded as simply Action. Canwest executives hoped that the new lineup would make the channel more attractive to viewers and advertisers.

While Showcase continues to air a thematically broad range of drama programming, its most recent successes, especially in original programming, have been with science fiction and fantasy programming. In 2010, a new original series, the supernatural crime drama Lost Girl, brought the channel its highest-rated series premiere ever with around 400,000 viewers. This was bested less than two years later by the debut of another original sci-fi series, Continuum, which had an average audience of 900,000 viewers. On October 27, 2010, ownership changed again as Shaw Communications gained control of Showcase as a result of its acquisition of Canwest and Goldman Sachs' interest in CW Media.

For the Fall 2013 season, Showcase unveiled a new tagline and branding campaign: "Character is Everything". The four-week marketing campaign was highlighted by promos narrated by characters from Showcase's series in first-person. An interactive website was created by Stitch Media. On it, viewers can create their own trailers for Showcase programming based on their own character.

On March 30, 2015, to commemorate the 20th anniversary of the network's launch, Showcase underwent a brand refresh, including a new logo — an updated version of the network's logo from 1995 — and a new slogan: "Beyond Ordinary".

Programming

From the beginning, Showcase has aired reruns of Canadian series, with the lineup changing from year to year, along with foreign series and independent films. It's known for carrying numerous TV series from American cable channels such as TNT and Syfy. In recent years, the channel has also increasingly aired second window repeats of both premium and network television series (the latter primarily sourced from one of its sister television networks, Global TV).

Showcase has also aired first-run Canadian series, dubbed "Showcase Originals". In the past, these have included Paradise Falls, KinK, and Naked Josh. Another of these shows, the low-budget Trailer Park Boys became a bona fide national phenomenon, spawning DVDs, merchandising tie-ins, and two feature films (Trailer Park Boys: The Movie and Trailer Park Boys: Countdown to Liquor Day). The success of Trailer Park Boys led to the increasing prominence of edgy and risqué programming on Showcase (which at the time used the tagline "Television Without Borders"), including a block consisting entirely of its eroticism-themed shows known as Fridays Without Borders. In recent years, Showcase has partaken in international co-productions.

The channel was formerly subject to a condition of licence obligating it to air 100% Canadian content between 7:00 p.m. and 10:00 p.m. in the time zone of the originating feed (currently Eastern Time only). While some foreign programming did air in the late afternoon prior to this window, any foreign programming subject to watershed restrictions was required to air at 10:00 p.m. EST or later. For a few years beginning in fall 2005, when the channel was drawing most of its highest ratings for programming acquired from U.S. cable networks, Showcase promoted 10:00 p.m. as its flagship timeslot, even hiring branded taxis in major markets to drive people home for free by 10:00 p.m. In March 2015, the CRTC announced it would no longer enforce conditions of licence related to nature of service; shortly thereafter, Showcase began airing foreign content in the 7-10 p.m. EST window for the first time.

The channel previously operated two timeshifted feeds operating on Eastern and Pacific Time Zone schedules. The West feed was discontinued on August 24, 2012, along with that of TVTropolis; since then, much of the channel's primetime programming has been rebroadcast on a three-hour delay to facilitate consistent promotion to both time zones (for example, if a program broadcasts at 9:00 p.m. EST and rebroadcasts at midnight EST, it would be promoted as airing at "9:00 p.m. E/P").

Original programming
Includes programs co-commissioned with international broadcasters.

References

External links

Analog cable television networks in Canada
1995 establishments in Canada
Television channels and stations established in 1995
Corus Entertainment networks
English-language television stations in Canada